Air Toronto , previously Commuter Express, was a passenger airline based at Toronto Pearson International Airport. It primarily provided connector flights for passengers of Air Canada.

History 
Commuter Express was founded in 1984 by Soundair for scheduled commuter flights using Fairchild Metros. In 1988, with a contract to feed Air Canada at Toronto Pearson International Airport the name was changed to Air Toronto and the Metros were replaced with Jetstream 31 aircraft.

In 1990, the airline's parent company, Soundair, entered receivership, but Air Toronto was continued to operate as a separate entity as it was profitable. On October 1, 1991, Air Toronto started flying under Ontario Express and the two airlines merged in December 1991.

Fleet

See also 
 List of defunct airlines of Canada

References 

Defunct airlines of Canada